Andrea del Sarto (16 July 1486 – 29 September 1530) was an Italian painter from Florence, whose career flourished during the High Renaissance and early Mannerism. He was known as an outstanding fresco decorator, painter of altar-pieces, portraitist, draughtsman, and colorist. Although highly regarded during his lifetime as an artist  ("without errors"), his renown was eclipsed after his death by that of his contemporaries Leonardo da Vinci, Michelangelo, and Raphael.

Early life and training 

Andrea del Sarto was born Andrea d'Agnolo di Francesco di Luca in Florence on 16 July 1486. Since his father, Agnolo, was a tailor (Italian: sarto), he became known as "del Sarto" (meaning "tailor's son").  Since 1677 some have attributed the surname Vannucchi with little documentation. By 1494 Andrea was apprenticed to a goldsmith, and then to a woodcarver and painter named Gian Barile, with whom he remained until 1498. According to his late biographer Vasari, he then apprenticed to Piero di Cosimo, and later with Raffaellino del Garbo (Carli).

Andrea and an older friend Franciabigio decided to open a joint studio at a lodging together in the Piazza del Grano. The  first product of their partnership may have been the Baptism of Christ for the Florentine Compagnia dello Scalzo, the beginning of a monochrome fresco series. By the time the partnership was dissolved, Sarto's style bore the stamp of individuality. According to the Encyclopædia Britannica, it "is marked throughout his career by an interest, exceptional among Florentines, in effects of colour and atmosphere and by sophisticated informality and natural expression of emotion."

Frescoes at SS Annunziata in Florence
From 1509 to 1514 the Servite Order employed Del Sarto, Franciabigio, and Andrea Feltrini in a programme of frescoes at Basilica della Santissima Annunziata di Firenze.  Sarto completed seven frescoes in the forecourt or atrium (the chiostro dei voti) before the Servite church, five of which illustrated the Life and miracles of Filippo Benizzi, a Servite saint who died in 1285 (canonized 1671). He executed them rapidly, depicting the saint healing a leper through the gift of his undertunic; predicting the bad end of some blasphemers; and restoring a girl possessed with a devil. The two final frescoes of the series depicted the healing of a child at the death bed of Filippo Benizzi and the curing of sick adults and children through his relic garment held at the church. All five frescoes were completed before the close of 1510. The original contract also required him to paint five scenes of the life and miracles of St. Sebastian, but he told the Servites that he no longer wished to continue with the second cycle, most likely due to the low remuneration. The Servites convinced him to do two more frescoes in the forecourt, although of a different subject matter: a Procession of the Magi (containing a self-portrait) finished in 1511 and a Nativity of the Virgin. These paintings met with respect, the correctness of the contours being particularly admired, and earned for Sarto the nickname of "Andrea senza errori" (Andrea the perfect). Towards 1512 he painted an (San Gallo Annunciation) Annunciation in the Church of San Gallo and a Marriage of Saint Catherine (Dresden).

By 1514 Andrea had finished his last two frescoes in the Chiostro dei Voti (SS. Annunziata), including his masterpiece, the Nativity of the Virgin, which fuses the influence of Leonardo, Ghirlandaio, and Fra Bartolomeo. By November 1515 he had finished at the nearby Chiostro of the Confraternity of St. John the Baptist, commonly known as the Scalzo the Allegory of Justice and the Baptist preaching in the desert, followed in 1517 by John Baptizing the People.

Visit to France

Before the end of 1516, a Pietà of Del Sarto's composition, and afterwards a Madonna, were sent to the French Court. This led to an invitation from François I, in 1518, and he journeyed to Paris in June of that year, along with his pupil Andrea Squarzzella, leaving his wife, Lucrezia, in Florence.

According to Giorgio Vasari, Andrea's pupil and biographer, Lucrezia wrote to Andrea and demanded he return to Italy. The King assented, but only on the understanding that his absence from France was to be short.  He then entrusted Andrea with a sum of money to be expended in purchasing works of art for the French Court.  By Vasari's account, Andrea took the money and used it to buy himself a house in Florence, thus ruining his reputation and preventing him from ever returning to France. The story inspired Robert Browning's poem-monologue "Andrea del Sarto Called the 'Faultless Painter'" (1855), but is now believed by some historians to be apocryphal.

Later works in Florence

In 1520 he resumed work in Florence, and executed the Faith and Charity  in the cloister of the Scalzo. These were succeeded by the Dance of the Daughter of Herodias, the Beheading of the Baptist,  the Presentation of his head to Herod, an allegory of Hope, the Apparition of the Angel to Zacharias (1523) and the monochrome Visitation.  This last was painted in the autumn of 1524, after Andrea had returned from Luco in Mugello, whence an outbreak of bubonic plague in Florence had driven him and his family. In 1525 he returned to paint in the Annunziata cloister the Madonna del Sacco, a lunette named after a sack against which Joseph is represented propped. In this painting the generous virgin's gown and her gaze indicate his influence on the early style of pupil Pontormo.

In 1523 Andrea painted a copy of the portrait group of Pope Leo X by Raphael; this copy is now in the Museo di Capodimonte in Naples, while the original remains at the Pitti Palace. The Raphael painting was owned by Ottaviano de' Medici, and requested by Federico II Gonzaga, Duke of Mantua.  Unwilling to part with the original, Ottaviano retained Andrea to produce a copy, which he passed to the Duke as the original. The imitation was so faithful that even Giulio Romano, who had himself manipulated the original to some extent, was completely fooled; and, on showing the copy years afterwards to Vasari, who knew the truth, he could be convinced that it was not genuine only when a private mark on the canvas was pointed out to him by Vasari.

Andrea's final work at the Scalzo was the Nativity of the Baptist (1526).  In the following year he completed his last important painting, a Last Supper at San Salvi (now an inner suburb of Florence), in which all the characters appear to be portraits. The church is now the Museo del Cenacolo di Andrea del Sarto.

A number of his paintings were considered to be self-portraits. A Portrait of a Young Man in the National Gallery, London was formerly believed to be a self-portrait, as was the Portrait of Becuccio Bicchieraio in National Gallery of Scotland, but both are now known not to be. There is a self-portrait at Alnwick Castle, a young man about twenty years, with his elbow on a table. Another youthful portrait is in the Uffizi Gallery, and the Pitti Palace contains more than one.

Madonna of the Harpies

The Madonna of the Harpies is a depiction of the Virgin and child on a pedestal, flanked by two saints (Bonaventure or Francis and John the Evangelist), and at her feet two cherubs. The pedestal is decorated with a relief depicting some feminine figures interpreted as harpies and thus gave rise, in English, to the name of the painting. Originally completed in 1517 for the convent of San Francesco dei Macci, the altarpiece now resides in the Uffizi.  In an Italy swamped with a tsunami of Madonnas, it would be easy to overlook this work; however, this commonly copied scheme also lends itself to comparison of his style with that of his contemporaries. The figures have a Leonardo da Vinci-like aura, and the stable pyramid of their composition provides a unified structure. In some ways, his rigid adherence is more classical than Leonardo da Vinci's but less so than Fra Bartolomeo's representations of the Holy Family.

Personal life
Andrea married Lucrezia (del Fede), widow of a hatter named Carlo, of Recanati, on 26 December 1512.  Lucrezia appears in many of his paintings, often as a Madonna.  However, Vasari describes her as "faithless, jealous, and vixenish with the apprentices".  She is similarly characterized in Robert Browning's poem.

Andrea died in Florence at age 44 during an outbreak of Bubonic Plague at the end of September 1530.  He was buried unceremoniously by the Misericordia in the church of the Servites.  In Lives of the Artists, Vasari claimed Andrea received no attention at all from his wife during his terminal illness.  However, it was well known at the time that plague was highly contagious, so it has been speculated that Lucrezia was simply afraid to contract the virulent and frequently-fatal disease.  If true, this well-founded caution was rewarded, as she survived her husband by 40 years.

Critical assessment and legacy
It was Michelangelo who had introduced Vasari in 1524 to Andrea's studio. He is said to have thought very highly of Andrea's talents. Of those who initially followed his style in Florence, the most prominent would have been Jacopo Pontormo, but also Rosso Fiorentino, Francesco Salviati, and Jacopino del Conte. Other lesser known assistants and pupils include Bernardo del Buda, Lamberto Lombardi, Nannuccio Fiorentino, and Andrea Squazzella.

Vasari, however, was highly critical of his teacher, alleging that, although having all the prerequisites of a great artist, he lacked ambition and that divine fire of inspiration which animated the works of his more famous contemporaries: Leonardo da Vinci, Michelangelo, and Raphael.

On 21 November 1848, the play Andre del Sarto, by Alfred de Musset, premiered in Paris.

In 1968 the opera Andrea del Sarto by French composer Jean-Yves Daniel-Lesur was based on Alfred de Musset's 1848 play.

Partial anthology of works

 Holy Family with St. Peter Martyr (1507-1508, Pinacoteca di Bari)
 Noli me tangere (c. 1510, Museo del Cenacolo di Andrea del Sarto, Florence)
 Virgin, Child, Elizabeth and John the Baptist (c. 1513, National Gallery, London)
 Portrait of the Artist's Wife (1513-1514, Museo del Prado, Madrid)
 Nativity of the Virgin (1513-1514, Santissima Annunziata, Florence)
 Madonna of the Harpies (Virgin and Child, with St. Francis, St. John the Evangelist, and two angels)  (1517, painted at S. Francesco, now in Uffizi, Florence)
 Portrait of a Young Man (1517-18, National Gallery, London)
 Charity (1518, Louvre, Paris)
 Julius Caesar Receives Tribute (c. 1520, fresco at Poggio a Caiano; completed by Alessandro Allori)
 Virgin Surrounded by Saints (Pitti Palace, Florence) 
 Madonna della Scala (c. 1522-1523, Museo del Prado, Madrid)
 Panciatichi Assumption (c. 1522-1523, Galleria Palatina, Pitti Palace, Florence)
 Pietà (1523-1524, Galleria Palatina, Pitti Palace, Florence)
 Passerini Assumption (1526, Galleria Palatina, Pitti Palace, Florence)
 Last Supper (1511-1527, Museo del Cenacolo di Andrea del Sarto, Florence)
 The Disputation on the Trinity (c. 1528, altarpiece  for the Church of San Gallo, now in the Uffizi, Florence)
 Gambassi Altarpiece (c. 1528, Galleria Palatina, Pitti Palace, Florence)
 Barberini Holy Family (c. 1528, Galleria Nazionale di Arte Antica, Palazzo Barberini, Rome)
 St. James with Two Youngs (c. 1528-1529, Uffizi, Florence)
 Vallombrosa Polyptych (c. 1528-1529, Uffizi, Florence)
 Holy Family with John the Baptist (c. 1529, Hermitage, St. Petersburg)
 Borgherini Holy Family (c. 1529, Metropolitan Museum, New York)
 Medici Holy Family (c. 1529, Galleria Palatina, Palazzo Pitti, Florence)
 Madonna in Glory with Four Saints (1530, Galleria Palatina, Palazzo Pitti, Florence)

See also
Illustrated Biographies of the Great Artists

Notes

References

External links

 Andrea del Sarto in the "History of Art"
 Browning's "Andrea del Sarto" (aka "The Faultless Painter")
 

1486 births
1530 deaths
16th-century deaths from plague (disease)
15th-century Italian painters
Italian male painters
16th-century Italian painters
Painters from Florence
Italian Renaissance painters
Catholic painters